Stellingwarfs is a Westphalian and Friso-Saxon dialect spoken in Ooststellingwerf and Weststellingwerf in the Dutch province of Friesland, and also in Steenwijkerland and Westerveld in the Dutch province of Overijssel and Drenthe.

Like Het Bildt and Leeuwarden, Weststellingwerf and Ooststellingwerf are among the municipalities of Friesland where West Frisian is not spoken.

The language was identified by the government of the Netherlands in 1996 within Low Saxon.

References

External links
Stichting Stellingwarver Schrieversronte
Alphabet and pronunciation

Westphalian dialects
Dutch Low Saxon
Languages of the Netherlands
Culture of Drenthe
Culture of Friesland
Culture of Overijssel
Kop van Overijssel
Ooststellingwerf
Steenwijkerland
Westerveld
Weststellingwerf